The America Zone was one of the three regional zones of the 1957 Davis Cup.

7 teams entered the America Zone, with the winner going on to compete in the Inter-Zonal Zone against the winners of the Eastern Zone and Europe Zone. The United States defeated Brazil in the final and progressed to the Inter-Zonal Zone.

Draw

Quarterfinals

Canada vs. Brazil

Venezuela vs. Cuba

Caribbean/West Indies vs. United States

Semifinals

Brazil vs. Israel

Venezuela vs. United States

Final

United States vs. Brazil

References

External links
Davis Cup official website

Davis Cup Americas Zone
America Zone
Davis Cup